Prime Minister Trudeau may refer to:
Pierre Trudeau (1919–2000), 15th Prime Minister of Canada (1968–1979, 1980–1984)
Justin Trudeau (born 1971), 23rd and current Prime Minister of Canada since 2015 and son of the 15th Prime Minister

See also
 Trudeau (surname)